Johannes Strolz (born 12 September 1992) is an Austrian World Cup alpine ski racer. He won the gold medal in the combined at the 2022 Olympics. He specializes in the technical events of slalom and giant slalom. He is the son of Hubert Strolz, the gold medalist in Combined at the 1988 Winter Olympics in Calgary. He and his father became the first father-son duo to win gold in Alpine Skiing at the Olympics.

Biography

Youth and Europa Cup 
Strolz was born on September 12, 1992, in Bludenz, Austria. His father, Hubert Strolz, became the Olympic champion in combined at the 1988 Winter Olympics in Calgary. After graduating from the famous Schigymnasium Stams, he became a member of the junior squad of the Austrian Skiing Federation. Making his debut in the FIS Alpine Ski Europa Cup, Strolz's first success came at the World Junior Alpine Skiing Championships 2012, where he won the bronze medal in the Super-G, behind Switzerland's Ralph Weber and Nils Mani. At the following championships in Québec, he failed to repeat the win of a medal, still finishing within the top 20. Strolz then began shifting his focus onto the technical competitions of slalom and giant slalom. He became the overall champion of the Europa Cup in the 2017-18 season.

World Cup and Olympic Games 
Johannes Strolz debuted on the FIS Alpine Ski World Cup at the Giant Slalom of Val-d’Isère in December 2013. He then struggled to deliver results and only appeared occasionally on the World Cup. In December 2019, he achieved his first world cup points, finishing 30th at Garmisch-Partenkirchen. At the slalom of Madonna di Campiglio in January 2020, Strolz reached his best result at that point, tenth place. He failed to win further points at the World Cup and was dismissed from the squad for that reason. He was granted to train with the Austrian team sometimes. Strolz had to pay for everything himself, including preparing his skis. Two years after his top-ten finish, he unexpectedly won the slalom race of Adelboden on January 9, 2022.

At the 2022 Winter Olympics, Strolz took part in the Alpine Combined, Slalom and Team Event. He won a medal in the three events, two gold and one silver medal. Thirty-four years after his father became an Olympic champion in Calgary, Strolz won the Alpine Combined, becoming the first father-son duo to win gold in Alpine Skiing at the Olympics. He then claimed the silver medal in the slalom, only beaten by French skier Clement Noel, and the gold medal in the team event.

References

External links
 

1992 births
Living people
Austrian male alpine skiers
People from Bludenz
Alpine skiers at the 2022 Winter Olympics
Medalists at the 2022 Winter Olympics
Olympic alpine skiers of Austria
Olympic medalists in alpine skiing
Olympic gold medalists for Austria
Olympic silver medalists for Austria
Sportspeople from Vorarlberg